Lempzours is a commune in the Dordogne department in Nouvelle-Aquitaine in southwestern France. It is around 20 km north of Périgueux.

Population

See also
Communes of the Dordogne department

References

Communes of Dordogne